Rekha Raju is an Indian classical dance performer and teacher from Bangalore, Karnataka. She specialises in the Bharatnatyam and Mohiniyattam dance forms.

Early life and education
Rekha was born in brahmin family at Palakkad district, Kerala to M.R.Raju, a theatre artiste, and Jayalakshmi Raghavan and brought up in Bangalore. She started learning classical dance at the age of four. She trained intensively under various gurus, including Kalamandalam Usha Datar, Raju Datar, Gopika Varma and Janardhanan. She started her college education pursuing a degree in commerce, while she studied Administration in Human Resource & Accounts and Performing of Art for her master's degree. She completed her Ph.D. in Fine Arts from Heidelberg University, Germany. She is a distinction holder of master's degree in Bharathnatyam and rank holder of the Vidwath [proficiency].

Career
She made her stage debut (Arangetram) in 2003 at Ravindra Kalakshetra in Bangalore. She has been performing on various stages in India and abroad from the age of four and performed as a soloist for many respected institutions of dance in India, including Yuva Sourabha, organized by the Kannada Culture Department, programme at the Indian Council for Cultural Relations, Institute of World Culture, Delhi International Festival, Poona Dance Festival, Kajuraho Dance Festival, Konark Dance Festival, Purana Quila, Chennai Seasonal Dance Festival, Chidambaram Dance Festival, Vishwa Kannada Sammelan at Belgaum, Andhra Music & Dance Festival etc. She has received much critical acclaim for both her solo and group choreography. Presently Raju is working as an assistant dance teacher at Bangalore Tamil Sangam and as a guest lecturer in dance at the International Center for Management & Indian Studies where the foreign students trained to improvise Indian culture. She is an auditioned artiste at the Bangalore Doordarshan and an empanelled artiste for the Indian Council for Cultural Relations. She also heads a dance institution named Nrithya Dhama, where she trains kids from minority backgrounds, and is also associated with the Freedom Foundation, a volunteer group that rehabilitates children with HIV. Raju has participated at the Tanjore Dance Festival where 1000 dancers performed, securing entrance in the Limca Book of Records. She has been honoured by the Bangolre Tamil sangam as the Best Young Dancer to promote Indian Art. She has also been given the title Swarna Mukhi by the Kalahalli Temple Trust.

Awards and credentials 
 Krishna Gana Sabha Endowment Award by Krishna Gana Sabha - 2016
 Yuva Kala Prathibha by Bangalore Club for Kathakali and The Arts - 2014
 Abhinava Bharathi - 2013
 Yuva Kala Bharathi by Bharat Kalachar - 2013
 Natya Veda Award by Natraj Dance Academy - 2013
 Nrithya Kaumudhi title by Government of Andhra Pradesh - 2012
 Nrithya Vibhushan by Bogadi Murthy - 2012
 Nrithya Rejini title by Kannur Arts Academy - 2011
 Swara Mukhi title by Kalhalli Temple Trust - 2010
 Best Young Dancer by Bangalore Tamil Sangam - 2009

References

External links

Performers of Indian classical dance
Mohiniyattam exponents
Bharatanatyam exponents
Living people
Malayali people
Dancers from Kerala
Indian classical choreographers
People from Palakkad district
Indian female classical dancers
Indian women choreographers
Indian choreographers
20th-century Indian dancers
20th-century Indian women artists
Women artists from Kerala
Year of birth missing (living people)